Robert William Burchfield CNZM, CBE (27 January 1923 – 5 July 2004) was a lexicographer, scholar, and writer, who edited the Oxford English Dictionary for thirty years to 1986, and was chief editor from 1971.

Education and career
Born in Whanganui, New Zealand, he studied at Wanganui Technical College and Victoria University in Wellington. After war service in the Royal Regiment of New Zealand Artillery, he graduated MA from Wellington in 1948 and won a Rhodes Scholarship to Magdalen College, Oxford University, in England, where he was tutored by C. S. Lewis. He became a Fellow of Magdalen and lecturer in English straight after graduating (1952–53), subsequently moving colleges to Christ Church (1953–57) and St Peter's (1955–79). Through C. T. Onions, the Magdalen librarian, Burchfield assisted in editing one of Onions's projects, the Oxford Dictionary of English Etymology. His preparation of an edition of the Ormulum was supervised by J. R. R. Tolkien.<ref name="OED/Independent">Oxford English Dictionary website entry for Robert Burchfield, including The Independent'''s obituary.</ref>

Onions recommended him to Dan Davin as editor of the second Supplement to the Oxford English Dictionary, on which he worked from 1957 to 1986. He re-established the network of volunteer readers sending in records of words that had helped to create the original OED but had been allowed to fall away. In 2004, it emerged that Burchfield's second supplement had removed a large number of words that were present in the earlier 1933 supplement edited by Onions and William Craigie, which Burchfield's second supplement incorporated. Four years later the full nature of his treatment of foreign words was shown: he deleted 17 per cent of the foreign loan words and words from regional forms of English; and his coverage was not as extensive as his predecessors, especially Onions, who included 45 per cent more loanwords and World Englishes. In 2012, a book documented Burchfield's work and showed that many of the omitted words had only a single recorded usage, but their removal ran against both what was thought to be the established OED editorial practice and a perception that he had opened up the dictionary to "World English".Leslie Kaufmann, "Dictionary Dust-Up (Danchi Is Involved)", The New York Times, 28 November 2012. The author of the book concerned, Sarah Ogilvie, complained that people were unfairly judging Burchfield and that her coverage had been misleadingly reported in the media.Huffington Post books blog, 29 November 2012, Sarah Ogilvie, "The OED: A Truly Global Dictionary".

Burchfield also participated in a 1980s BBC committee that monitored compliance with the broadcaster's policy of using received pronunciation in newscasting, before that policy was abandoned in 1989 in favor of "using announcers and newsreaders with a more representative range of accents."

In retirement, he produced a controversial new edition, substantially rewritten and less prescriptivist, of Fowler's Modern English Usage, the long-established style guide by Henry Watson Fowler.

He died in Abingdon-on-Thames at 81, in 2004. He married twice and had three children.

Selected worksSupplement to the Oxford English Dictionary, 4 vols, 1972–1986The Spoken Word, 1981The English Language, 1985Studies in Lexicography, 1987Unlocking the English Language, 1989The Cambridge History of the English Language, Vol. 5: English in Britain and Overseas, 1994
 Editor, Fowler's Modern English Usage'', Revised Edition, 1998

References

1923 births
2004 deaths
Alumni of Magdalen College, Oxford
New Zealand lexicographers
British lexicographers
Etymologists
New Zealand Rhodes Scholars
Victoria University of Wellington alumni
Fellows of Christ Church, Oxford
Fellows of St Peter's College, Oxford
Fellows of Magdalen College, Oxford
Chief editors of the Oxford English Dictionary
New Zealand expatriates in England
New Zealand Commanders of the Order of the British Empire
Companions of the New Zealand Order of Merit
New Zealand military personnel of World War II
20th-century lexicographers